Foo Mee Har (born 1966) is a Singaporean politician and businesswoman. A member of the governing People's Action Party (PAP), she has been the Member of Parliament (MP) representing the Ayer Rajah–Gek Poh division of West Coast GRC since 2011. 

Foo made her political debut in the 2011 general election as part of a five-member PAP team contesting in West Coast GRC and won 66.6% of the vote. During the 2015 general election, Foo retained her parliamentary seat in the West Coast GRC after defeating the opposition Reform Party with 78.6% of the vote. During the 2020 general election, Foo retained her parliamentary seat in West Coast GRC again after garnering 51.68% of vote.

Prior to entering politics, Foo had 30 years of corporate experience with leading international firms and has held senior leadership roles across businesses and geographies. She stepped down as Global Head of Priority & International Banking for Standard Chartered Bank in 2013 to focus on constituency work and to pursue other interests. She had a long-standing career at Standard Chartered Bank spanning 19 years covering Asia, Africa and Middle East markets.

Foo has been appointed as Chief Executive Officer of the Wealth Management Institute, Asia's Centre of Excellence for wealth and asset management education and research in 2015. She has also been appointed as Council Member of the Singapore Business Federation in 2018.

Education 
Foo studied at Ave Maria Convent School, Ipoh, Malaysia (1973–1982) and then at Loreto Normanhurst, Sydney (1983–1985).

In 1989, she was awarded with a Bachelor of Science (Psychology) degree by the University of New South Wales, Australia, graduating with First Class Honours

Career
Foo started her career in 1990 as a Management Consultant with Coopers and Lybrand Management Consultants (now PricewaterhouseCoopers) and PA Consulting Group. She later joined Jardine Matheson's shipping group as the Head of HR.

Foo was with Standard Chartered Bank from 1994 to 2012, during which she held a number of senior positions across the Group. From 2003–2005, Foo was appointed the Country Head of Consumer Banking in China, spearheading the growth of the Consumer Banking franchise in China. From 2006–2008, she was President & CEO of Standard Chartered Bank (Thai) pcl with overall responsibility for the Bank in Thailand. In 2008, Foo was appointed Global Head for Priority & International Banking business with overall responsibility for banking, financing and wealth management of affluent and international banking client segments, a business that spanned over 30 countries in Asia, Africa and Middle East. Foo was involved with a range of corporate community programs, including advocacy, outreach and fund-raising for causes such as avoidable blindness, HIV/AIDs and healthy living. She started the inaugural Standard Chartered Bangkok Marathon, which has become one of the largest sporting events.

In March 2011, Foo was featured in Sunday Times Women at the Top series, an eight-part weekly series on successful women in Singapore.

In July 2015, Foo was appointed Chief Executive Officer of the Wealth Management Institute in Singapore.

Political career

Foo joined the PAP in 2010, and was unveiled as PAP's candidate for the 2011 Singapore general election. During her introduction, Foo said that living abroad gave her the opportunity "to really reflect on Singapore, its government, systems and its processes" and appreciate its unique strengths.

After being elected, she was then appointed Deputy Chairperson of the Finance, Trade and Industry Government Parliamentary Committee (GPC) in the 14th Parliament of Singapore. PAP Women's WingFoo is the Treasurer to the PAP Women's Wing Executive Committee. She is also a member of the Advocacy Subcommittee. She led a position paper urging the government to put in an enhanced level of resources to effect the necessary change in the workplace to make it pro-family and called by flexi-work legislation.

In an interview with Channel NewsAsia, she said, "As a professional woman, I'm hoping that I can contribute to the women's agenda in Singapore. I'm a banker by profession, so hopefully this network can help me reach out to women, especially the professional women, and understand their issues."

Leveraging her portfolio in Parliament, her depth of experience in the financial sector as well as her experience as a working mother, Foo has championed the following causes:Fiscal SustainabilityAs Chairman of the Estimates Committee of Singapore Parliament, Foo has called on government to ensure spending remains sustainable and prudent, without imposing undue tax burdens on future generation of Singaporeans. She also raised the need for robust KPIs, monitoring mechanisms, transparency and accountability of government initiatives. Foo cautioned the government not to depend on outsourced vendors and consultants to supply technology knowledge, but to build a strong Singaporean core of highly competent public sector officers with cutting-edge expertise in technology, including data science and cyber security.Business TransformationFoo has been a strong advocate of government support to help small and medium-sized enterprises transform. She called on the government to shift to a higher gear where help provided becomes more targeted and solutions are tailored to address companies' specific operational issues. Concurrently, the private sector needs to step up and pull their own weight for transformation to succeed. Foo called for the development of strong local capabilities and ecosystems where companies can innovate, and embrace technology and R&D for successful business transformation. It is critical that the government institute a framework for the transfer of capabilities and expertise from MNCs to the local ecosystem, while creating good jobs in the local economy.Jobs and trainingFoo has consistently championed the need for improved skills development amongst Singaporeans, calling for national policy to prepare Singaporeans for the best jobs and top jobs  She also pushed for stronger connections between training programmes and employability, stating in Parliament that "There must be clear linkages from training courses, to skills, to jobs".  She has also spoken out for improved industry competency standards, improved work-study programmes and greater involvement of employers and trade organisations in the effort. In particular, Foo has called for the development of a strong "Singaporean Core" in all major sectors and more job opportunities for ‘Professionals, Managers, Executives and Technicians’ through place-and-train programmes, as well as the re-employment of older workers who wish to work.  When Singapore’s economy faced challenging economic times, she has consistently appealed for help for Singaporeans displaced by restructuring.

Foo has called on government to develop effective strategies to help workers transition to new kinds of work, as machine learning and robotics replace specific tasks performed by humans.Retirement AdequacyFoo has asked the government to help Singaporeans better understand their assets in the Central Provident Fund (CPF) and the "risk-return" comparisons with other financial products, as well as access to their funds.  She has also pushed for improved retirement adequacy particularly for women and financial security for seniors. Since 2013, she had championed options that allowed Singaporeans to monetise their HDB flats in order to supplement their retirements needs, if they wished to.  She also called for a review of CPF payout durations, a revamp of the CPF Investment Scheme and the launch of the Lifetime Retirement Investment Scheme (LRIS), all towards benefiting CPF members.EducationFoo pushed actively for breakthroughs in the education system in order to strongly position future generations of Singaporeans for ‘Industry 4.0’.  In 2018, she pointed out to Parliament that "The successful reinvention of our educational system depends on transforming pedagogy and redesigning learning tasks." She called on the government to blend work and study into degree programmes for more job ready graduates. With the shift in economic centre of gravity towards Asia, Foo called on the government to review school curriculum to enable students to develop a deeper understanding of ASEAN, China and India, and expand their regional language capabilities. She has been a strong advocate of lifelong learning, to ride the waves of change brought about by rapid technological disruptions and economic restructuring.Work-life balance'''

Since the start of her parliamentary career, Foo has championed the cause for more flexible work arrangements (flexi-work and work-from-home), especially for women and older workers, as well as other pro-family employment practices. She has also pushed for the Employment Act to extend better protection to ‘Professional, Managerial and Executive’ (PME) employees, as well as contract workers.  She said, "Flexi-work should be our response to the modern economy, where workforce agility can generate significant economic benefits and a means to attract and retain talent, and get the workforce engaged to boost the competitiveness of companies."

 Personal life 
After university graduation in 1989, Foo moved to Singapore as a permanent resident and married a Singaporean. She has two sons, aged 27 and 25 years.

Foo became a Singapore citizen in January 2008 after her stint of overseas postings (2003–2008), when she was eligible to apply for citizenship. Foo spoke about 'Singapore being home for the last 30 years' and that she 'want to make a difference to the lives of Singaporeans'.

In an interview with The Straits Times'' on 8 September 2008, Foo mentioned that taking up overseas postings in her job was "always a family decision". When Foo was offered the China position in 2003, her husband, then a general manager of a multinational company, quit his job to take up a China post with another company so that the family could relocate together. When Foo was offered the CEO post in Thailand, her family rallied behind her again.

References

External links 
 Foo Mee Har on Parliament of Singapore
 MP-Elect Profile

1966 births
Living people
Members of the Parliament of Singapore
People's Action Party politicians
University of New South Wales alumni
Singaporean women in politics
Singaporean people of Hakka descent
Malaysian emigrants to Singapore
People who lost Malaysian citizenship
Naturalised citizens of Singapore
Singapore Business Federation